Trafficking protein particle complex 9 is a protein that in humans is encoded by the TRAPPC9 gene.

Function

This gene encodes a protein that likely plays a role in NF-kappa-B signaling. Mutations in this gene have been associated with autosomal-recessive mental retardation. Alternatively spliced transcript variants have been described.

References

Further reading